Bombay Citizens' Committee was an advocacy group which lobbied to keep Bombay city out of Maharashtra during the state reorganisation. The group was headed by a leading cotton industrialist Sir Purshottamdas Thakurdas (1879-1961), with J.R.D. Tata as one of the members, and the committee was composed mostly of Gujaratis. The group submitted a 200-page application to States reorganisation committee in year 1954.

See also
Bombay Plan
FICCI

References

External links

Reorganisation of Indian states
History of Mumbai